Bart Buetow (born October 28, 1950) is a former American football tackle. He played for the New York Giants in 1973 and for the Minnesota Vikings in 1976.

References

1950 births
Living people
American football tackles
Minnesota Golden Gophers football players
New York Giants players
Minnesota Vikings players